Ángel Romero may refer to:

 Angel Romero (guitarist) (born 1946), Spanish guitarist
 Ángel Romero (cyclist) (1932–2007), Mexican cyclist and politician
 Ángel Romero (footballer) (born 1992), Paraguayan footballer
 Ángel Romero Díaz (born 1979), Spanish writer and politician